World of Plenty is a 1943 British documentary film directed by Paul Rotha for the Ministry of Agriculture and Fisheries. It discusses problems with, and possible improvements to, global food distribution.

Synopsis
An opening narration explaining that the film's purpose is to examine the "world strategy of food", in terms of its production, distribution and consumption. The film is then divided into three parts: "Food - As It Was", "Food - As It Is" and "Food - As It Might Be".

References

External links
 World of Plenty at BFI Screenonline

1943 films
British documentary films
Films directed by Paul Rotha
Documentary films about agriculture
British black-and-white films
1943 documentary films
1940s British films